Kendall Carroll was shot and killed on March 19, 2013, just two weeks after the fatal Albuquerque Police Department (APD) shooting of Parrish Dennison. Kendall and his brother were both involved in an officer stand off. The stand off lasted for more than four hours. Michael the younger brother surrendered midway while Kendall continued on.  State police sniper Shane Todd fired the lethal shot to end the stand off.

Throughout the altercation police threw tear gas into the apartment that the men were shooting at them from. Police were originally called to the scene because Kendall was a suspect in an earlier shooting which involved wounding an APD officer.

See also
Shooting of James Boyd
Alfred Redwine shooting
List of Albuquerque police shootings

References

Year of birth missing
2013 deaths
People shot dead by law enforcement officers in the United States
2013 in New Mexico
Albuquerque Police Department